Francisco Higuera Fernández (born 30 January 1965) is a Spanish former professional footballer who played mostly as an attacking midfielder – sometimes, he could operate as a forward.

Nicknamed Paquete, he appeared in 367 La Liga games over 12 seasons (76 goals), in representation of Mallorca and Zaragoza.

Club career
Higueras was born in Escurial, Province of Cáceres. After playing in all the youth categories at RCD Mallorca he made his senior debut at only 17, in a 3–0 Segunda División home win against Deportivo de La Coruña on 10 October 1982, and finished his first season with 16 matches and two goals as the Balearic Islands club promoted to La Liga. His first appearance in the top flight occurred on 24 September 1983 in a 3–0 loss at Atlético Madrid, and he went on to experience two relegations from that tier with the team.

In summer 1988, Higuera signed with Real Zaragoza, being an everpresent fixture with the Aragonese. In the 1993–94 campaign he scored a career-best 12 goals while also scoring the decisive penalty in the shootout victory over RC Celta de Vigo, in the Copa del Rey final, and being instrumental in their 1995 triumph in the UEFA Cup Winners' Cup, all this while often partnered offensively with Juan Esnáider, Miguel Pardeza and Gustavo Poyet (they recorded, in 1994–95, an impressive 5–4 away defeat of FC Barcelona in the Supercopa de España).

Higuera decided to have an abroad experience in 1997 at the age of 32, and joined Mexico's Puebla FC, being accompanied by Pardeza in the adventure. He returned home after one season, signing with lowly Xerez CD of Segunda División B and retiring in 2000.

After serving as general manager to the Andalusians for several seasons, Higuera switched to another modest club in 2009, Lorca Deportiva CF, also in that capacity.

International career
Higuera earned six caps for Spain, the first arriving on 15 January 1992 in a friendly match against Portugal where he replaced injured Emilio Butragueño early into the 0–0 draw in Torres Novas.

International goals
Scores and results list Spain's goal tally first, score column indicates score after each Higuera goal.

Honours
Zaragoza
Copa del Rey: 1993–94
UEFA Cup Winners' Cup: 1994–95

References

External links

1965 births
Living people
People from Tierra de Trujillo
Sportspeople from the Province of Cáceres
Spanish footballers
Footballers from Extremadura
Association football midfielders
La Liga players
Segunda División players
Segunda División B players
RCD Mallorca players
Real Zaragoza players
Xerez CD footballers
Liga MX players
Club Puebla players
Spain youth international footballers
Spain international footballers
Spanish expatriate footballers
Expatriate footballers in Mexico
Spanish expatriate sportspeople in Mexico
Spanish football managers
Tercera División managers
Xerez CD managers